VMP may refer to:
 Veterinary medical products
 Soyaltepec Mazatec
 Validation master plan
 Variational message passing
 Veterans Memorial Parkway
 Viewpoint Media Player
 Virginia Marine Police
 Virginia Motorsports Park